Michel Broillet (born 15 July 1944) is a Swiss weightlifter. He competed in the men's middle heavyweight event at the 1976 Summer Olympics.

References

1944 births
Living people
Swiss male weightlifters
Olympic weightlifters of Switzerland
Weightlifters at the 1976 Summer Olympics
Place of birth missing (living people)